Bimal Roy (12 July 1909 – 7 January 1966) was an Indian film director. He is particularly noted for his realistic and socialistic films such as Do Bigha Zamin, Parineeta, Biraj Bahu, Devdas, Madhumati, Sujata, Parakh and Bandini, making him an important director of Hindi cinema. Inspired by Italian neo-realistic cinema, he made Do Bigha Zamin after watching Vittorio De Sica's Bicycle Thieves (1948). His work is particularly known for his mise en scène which he employed to portray realism. He won a number of awards throughout his career, including eleven Filmfare Awards, two National Film Awards, and the International Prize of the Cannes Film Festival. Madhumati won 9 Filmfare Awards in 1958, a record held for 37 years.

Biography
Bimal Roy was born on 12 July 1909, to a Bengali Baidya family in Suapur, Dhaka, which was then part of the Eastern Bengal and Assam province of British India and is now part of Bangladesh. He produced many movies in Bengali and Hindi.

Career

Bimal Roy moved to Calcutta and entered the field of cinema as a camera assistant with New Theatres Pvt. Ltd. During this time, he assisted director P.C. Barua as Publicity Photographer, on the hit 1935 film Devdas, starring K.L. Saigal. In the 1940s and 1950s Roy was part of the parallel cinema movement in post-war India. He collaborated on Anjangarh (1948), one of the last major films of the New Theatres, however, the Kolkata-based film industry was now on the decline, thus Roy shifted his base to Bombay (now Mumbai), along with his team in 1950, which included Hrishikesh Mukherjee (editor), Nabendu Ghosh (screenwriter), Asit Sen (assistant director), Kamal Bose (cinematographer) and later, Salil Chaudhury (music director), and by 1952 he had restarted the second phase of his career with Maa (1952), for Bombay Talkies. He was famous for his romantic-realist melodramas that took on important social issues while still being entertaining. He was a filmmaker of great and in-depth understanding of human strengths and weaknesses. In 1959, he was a member of the jury at the 1st Moscow International Film Festival.

He died of cancer on 7 January 1966 at the age of 56. He was survived by four children: daughters Rinki Bhattacharya, Yashodhara Roy and Aparajita Sinha, and his only son, Joy Roy. His eldest daughter, Rinki Bhattacharya, married the director Basu Bhattacharya against the wishes of both their families. The marriage collapsed within a few years, but resulted in the birth of a son, the actor and screenplay writer Aditya Bhattacharya. Rinki Bhattacharya now heads the Bimal Roy Memorial Committee.

Awards
Bimal Roy has received several awards.

Filmfare Awards

 1953: Filmfare Award for Best Film – Do Bigha Zamin
 1953: Filmfare Award for Best Director – Do Bigha Zamin
 1954: Filmfare Award for Best Director – Parineeta
 1955: Filmfare Award for Best Director – Biraj Bahu
 1958: Filmfare Award for Best Film – Madhumati
 1958: Filmfare Award for Best Director – Madhumati
 1959: Filmfare Award for Best Film – Sujata
 1959: Filmfare Award for Best Director – Sujata
 1960: Filmfare Award for Best Director – Parakh
 1963: Filmfare Award for Best Film – Bandini
 1963: Filmfare Award for Best Director – Bandini

National Film Awards

 1953: All India Certificate of Merit for Best Feature Film – Do Bigha Zamin
 1954: All India Certificate of Merit for Best Feature Film – Biraj Bahu
 1955: Certificate of Merit for Best Feature Film in Hindi – Devdas
 1958: President's silver medal for Best Feature Film in Hindi – Madhumati
 1959: All India Certificate of Merit for the Third Best Feature Film – Sujata
 1963: Best Feature Film in Hindi – Bandini

Cannes Film Festival
Won International Prize:
 1953 for Do Bigha Zamin

Nominated for Grand Prize of the Festival:
 1953 for Do Bigha Zamin

Nominated for Palme d'Or:
 1955 for Biraj Bahu
 1960 for Sujata

Music
Bimal Roy usually alternated between music directors Salil Chowdhury and S.D. Burman. His films featured beautiful and memorable songs, rendered by all the top playback singers of the day. Some of the notable songs from Roy's films include:
 "Jalte Hain Jiske Liye" from Sujata (1959), sung by Talat Mahmood
 "Chali Radhe Rani" from Parineeta (1953), sung by Manna Dey
 "Aa Ri Aa Nindiya" from Do Bigha Zamin (1953), music by Salil Chowdhury, sung by Lata Mangeshkar
 "Ab Aage Teri Marzi" from Devdas (1955), music by S.D. Burman, sung by Lata Mangeshkar
 "Aan Milo Aan Milo Shyam Sabere" from Devdas (1955), music by S.D. Burman, sung by Manna Dey, Geeta Dutt 
 "Dil Tadap Tadap Ke Keh Raha" from Madhumati (1958), music by Salil Chowdhury, sung by Mukesh, Lata Mangeshkar
 "Suhana Safar Aur Yeh Mausam Haseen" from Madhumati (1958), music by Salil Chowdhury, sung by Mukesh
 "Aaja Re Pardesi" from Madhumati (1958), music by Salil Chowdhury, sung by Lata Mangeshkar
 "Ghadi Ghadi Mora Dil Dhadake" from Madhumati (1958), music by Salil Chowdhury, sung by Lata Mangeshkar 
 "Zulmi Sang Aankh Ladi" from Madhumati (1958), music by Salil Chowdhury, sung by Lata Mangeshkar
 "O Sajana Barkha Bahaar" from Parakh (1960), music by Salil Chowdhury, sung by Lata Mangeshkar
 "Mora Gora Ang Lai Le" from Bandini (1963), music by S.D. Burman, sung by Lata Mangeshkar

Legacy
Bimal Roy's influence was far-reaching, both in Indian cinema and world cinema. In Indian cinema, his influence extended to both mainstream commercial Hindi cinema and the emerging Parallel Cinema. His film Do Bigha Zamin (1953) was the first film to successfully straddle art and commercial cinema. It was a commercial and critical success, winning the International Prize at the 1954 Cannes Film Festival. As a result, the film's success paved the way for the Indian New Wave.

In commercial cinema, the most influential film he directed was perhaps Madhumati (1958), his first and only collaboration with Ritwik Ghatak (who wrote the screenplay), and one of the earliest films to deal with reincarnation. It is believed to have been the source of inspiration for many later works dealing with the theme of reincarnation in Indian cinema, Indian television, and perhaps world cinema. It may have been the source of inspiration for the American film The Reincarnation of Peter Proud (1975) and the Hindi film Karz (1980), both of which dealt with reincarnation and have been influential in their respective cultures. Karz in particular was remade several times: as the Kannada film Yuga Purusha (1989), the Tamil film Enakkul Oruvan (1984), and more recently the Bollywood film Karzzzz (2008). Karz may have also inspired the American film Chances Are (1989). The most recent film to be directly inspired by Madhumati is the hit Bollywood film Om Shanti Om (2007), which led to Roy's daughter Rinki Bhattacharya accusing the film of plagiarism and threatening legal action against its producers.

Bimal Roy discovered and gave a break to many children, such as Asha Parekh, Sona Mastan Mirza, Baby Farida, & Baby Sonu (Bablani), who would later become quite famous.

Bimal Roy's films continue to be screened at major national and international film festivals in India, Europe and North America. His films are being restored and digitised by the National Film Archive of India (NFAI) at Pune. In July 2014, Prince of Wales Museum, Mumbai hosted an exhibition; Bimal Roy: Life & Times, organised in collaboration with his children. The exhibits included screening of the films; Madhumati, Sujata and Bandini, besides film posters, costumes and memorabilia, including an Arriflex camera used to shoot Devdas and Sujata.

The Bimal Roy Memorial Trophy has been awarded every year since 1997, by the Bimal Roy Memorial & Film Society to honor both experienced artists and other contributors from the Indian film industry as well as new and upcoming outstanding young filmmakers.

A postage stamp, bearing his face, was released by India Post to honour him on 8 January 2007.

Filmography

Bibliography

References

External links
 Bimal Roy Memorial website
 Bimal Roy Online Museum
 
Bimal Roy Life and Filmography on Indian Cine

1909 births
1966 deaths
20th-century Indian film directors
Bengali Hindus
Bengali film directors
Hindi-language film directors
University of Calcutta alumni
People from Dhaka
Hindi film producers
Film directors from Kolkata
Film producers from Kolkata
Filmfare Awards winners